Niccolò Circignani (c. 1517/1524 – after 1596) was an Italian painter of the late-Renaissance or Mannerist period.

Biography
Born in Pomarance, he is one of three Italian painters called Pomarancio. His first works are documented from the 1560s, where he painted frescos on the Old Testament stories for the Vatican Belvedere, where he may have worked alongside Santi di Tito and Giovanni de' Vecchi. He also completed altarpieces for Orvieto (1570), Umbertide (1572), Città di Castello (1573–1577) as well as Città della Pieve.

He worked at Orvieto Cathedral with Hendrick van den Broeck, a brother of the sculptor Willem van den Broecke and a relative of the painter Chrispijn van den Broeck. He painted frescoes (1568) in the church of the Maestà delle Volte in Perugia, the Resurrection (1569 in Panicale) and an Annunciation (1577, now in the Pinacoteca Comunale, Città di Castello).

He painted frescoes (starting 1574) on mythologic themes including a Judgement of Paris, Stories from the Aenid, and others, in collaboration with Giovanni Antonio Pandolfi in the Palazzo della Corgna in Castiglione del Lago.

From 1579 he returned to Rome to work with Matthijs Bril and decorated the Sala della Meridiana in the Torre dei Venti (finished before the end of 1580) as well as in the Loggie (1580–83) in the Vatican. He then became one of the artists favored by the Jesuits. Assisted by Matteo da Siena, he began depicting scenes of Jesuit martyrdom. He was further commissioned such works, depicting church martyrs, with help from Antonio Tempesta for the church of Santo Stefano Rotondo. Here he finally completed over thirty graphic scenes of martyrdom, depicting every gruesome method as if it were an advertisement for a torture chamber.
Visitors like Charles Dickens expressed horror at the spectacle in this church, calling it a: 
 damp, mildewed vault of an old church in the outskirts of Rome, ... by reason of the hideous paintings with which its walls are covered. These represent the martyrdoms of saints and early Christians; and such a panorama of horror and butchery no man could imagine in his sleep, though he were to eat a whole pig raw, for supper. Grey-bearded men being boiled, fried, grilled, crimped, singed, eaten by wild beasts, worried by dogs, buried alive, torn asunder by horses, chopped up small with hatchets: women having their breasts torn with iron pinchers, their tongues cut out, their ears screwed off, their jaws broken, their bodies stretched upon the rack, or skinned upon the stake, or crackled up and melted in the fire: these are among the mildest subjects.

Circignani's last documented painting, in Cascia, is from 1596.

Sources

External links

Notes

1530s births
1590s deaths
People from  Pomarance
16th-century Italian painters
Italian male painters
Italian Mannerist painters
Fresco painters